A leadership spill of the Australian Labor Party (ALP), then the opposition party in the Parliament of Australia, was held on 31 May 1977. Former Treasurer Bill Hayden unsuccessfully challenged Labor leader Gough Whitlam. Whitlam was narrowly re-elected by 32 votes to 30 (the smallest possible majority) leading him to later refer to many in his caucus as 'out of touch'.

Background
After his party's heavy defeat at the 1975 election Gough Whitlam was comfortably re-elected leader of the ALP. However over the following year his support began to fall away and many MPs lobbied his former Treasurer Bill Hayden to stand against him. In March 1977 Hayden announced his candidacy.

Candidates
 Bill Hayden, Shadow Minister for Economic Management, Member for Oxley
 Gough Whitlam, incumbent Leader, Member for Werriwa

Potential candidates who declined to run
 Lionel Bowen, Shadow Attorney-General, Member for Kingsford Smith

Results

Leadership ballot
The following tables gives the ballot results:

Deputy leadership ballot

Aftermath
Despite surviving the vote the ALP only gained a handful of seats at the 1977 election, which prompted Whitlam to resign as leader with Hayden elected as his replacement.

References

Australian Labor Party leadership spills
Gough Whitlam
May 1977 events in Australia
1977 elections in Australia
Australian Labor Party leadership spill